Diphylleia grayi, the skeleton flower, is a species of perennial plant in the family Berberidaceae. It is native to northern and central Japan.

Description

After it flowers, it bears dark blue-purple fruit with a white powdery coating. The plant is known to have petals that become transparent when in contact with water, giving it its common name. Once it is dry, the petals return to white.

Distribution and habitat
The plant is distributed from north to central Honshu, Hokkaido, Mount Daisen, and Sakhalin. It grows in slightly moist places in the woods of high mountains.

In popular culture
South Korean artist Jonghyun, a member of the boy band Shinee, wrote and released a song titled "Diphylleia Grayi" in 2015 as part of his album Story Op.1. The composition "Diphylleia Grayi" uses the double-leaf metaphor as the personification of internal and external struggle. In September 2015, Jonghyun presented his book Skeleton Flower: Things That Have Been Released and Set Free.

Gallery

References

Berberidaceae
Flora of Japan
Plants described in 1868